This is a list of airports in Ohio (a U.S. state), grouped by type and sorted by location. It contains all public-use and military airports in the state. Some private-use and former airports may be included where notable, such as airports that were previously public-use, those with commercial enplanements recorded by the FAA or airports assigned an IATA airport code.

Note: Cincinnati is served by the Cincinnati/Northern Kentucky International Airport located in Hebron, Kentucky, and Marietta is served by the Mid-Ohio Valley Regional Airport located in Wood County, West Virginia.

Airports

See also 
List of defunct airports in the United States
 Ohio World War II Army Airfields
 Wikipedia:WikiProject Aviation/Airline destination lists: North America#Ohio

References 
Federal Aviation Administration (FAA):
 FAA Airport Data (Form 5010) from National Flight Data Center (NFDC), also available from AirportIQ 5010
 National Plan of Integrated Airport Systems for 2017–2021, updated September 2016
 Passenger Boarding (Enplanement) Data for CY 2016, updated October 2017

Ohio Department of Transportation (ODOT):
 Office of Aviation: Airports

Other sites used as a reference when compiling and updating this list:
 Aviation Safety Network - used to check IATA airport codes.
 Great Circle Mapper: Airports in Ohio - used to check IATA and ICAO airport codes.
 Abandoned & Little-Known Airfields: Ohio - used for information on former airports.

 
Airports
Ohio
Airports